The Women's 100m T36 had its Final held on September 16 at 18:03.

Medalists

Results

References
Final

Athletics at the 2008 Summer Paralympics
2008 in women's athletics